Agonopterix rutana is a moth of the family Depressariidae. It is found in southern Europe, Turkey and Israel.

The larvae have been recorded feeding on Ruta chalepensis.

References

Moths described in 1794
Agonopterix
Moths of Europe
Moths of Asia